{{DISPLAYTITLE:C7H15N}}
The molecular formula C7H15N (molar mass: 113.20 g/mol, exact mass: 113.1204 u) may refer to:

 Azocane
 Dimethylpiperidines
 2,6-Dimethylpiperidine
 3,5-Dimethylpiperidine

Molecular formulas